Farrell Till (April 26, 1933 – October 3, 2012) was an American publisher who served as the editor of the formerly published The Skeptical Review and was a prominent debater against Christianity and biblical inerrancy. He published critical articles of the inerrancy subject as well as skeptical examinations of other biblical interpretations.

Till was a member of People for the Ethical Treatment of Animals, the National Center for Science Education, and the Council for Secular Humanism.

Till was a part-time minister and missionary for the Church of Christ, but left the church in 1963 and later became an atheist. In addition to having edited The Skeptical Review, Till ran the "Errancy" list, which discusses biblical contradictions and errors. He formally and informally debated with numerous Christian thinkers and evangelists, including Christian apologist Norman Geisler and Young Earth creationism advocate Kent Hovind.

References

External links
 Farrell Till's articles from Archive.org
 More articles by Farrell Till, including the Skeptical Review archives

1933 births
2012 deaths
American atheist writers
American former Protestants
American humanists
American print editors
American skeptics
Secular humanists
Christ myth theory proponents
Critics of Christianity
Former members of the Churches of Christ
Harding University alumni